The Torrone di Nav is a mountain of the Swiss Lepontine Alps, located east of Olivone in the canton of Ticino. On its northern side it overlooks the lake of Luzzone.

References

External links
 Torrone di Nav on Hikr

Mountains of the Alps
Mountains of Ticino
Lepontine Alps
Mountains of Switzerland